28S ribosomal protein S17, mitochondrial is a protein that in humans is encoded by the MRPS17 gene.

Mammalian mitochondrial ribosomal proteins are encoded by nuclear genes and help in protein synthesis within the mitochondrion. Mitochondrial ribosomes (mitoribosomes) consist of a small 28S subunit and a large 39S subunit. They have an estimated 75% protein to rRNA composition compared to prokaryotic ribosomes, where this ratio is reversed. Another difference between mammalian mitoribosomes and prokaryotic ribosomes is that the latter contain a 5S rRNA. Among different species, the proteins comprising the mitoribosome differ greatly in sequence, and sometimes in biochemical properties, which prevents easy recognition by sequence homology. This gene encodes a 28S subunit protein that belongs to the ribosomal protein S17P family. The encoded protein is moderately conserved between human mitochondrial and prokaryotic ribosomal proteins. Pseudogenes corresponding to this gene are found on chromosomes 1p, 3p, 6q, 14p, 18q, and Xq.

References

Further reading

Ribosomal proteins